Roberts Park is a historic public park and national historic district located at Connersville, Fayette County, Indiana.  The parkland was donated to the city of Connersville in 1902.  The 80-acre, rectangular site includes the contributing stone wall lined drives, stone pillars with lamps, a sundial, the Pavilion (1903), Amphitheatre (1907-1909), Horse Track (1903), Judge's Stand (1903), Horse Barns (c. 1910), Liberty Building (1932), Police Building (c. 1940), James E. Roberts Memorial Building (1936), and the Roberts Park Pool (1936).  A number of park improvements were made by the Works Progress Administration.  Located in the park is the Longwood Covered Bridge, a non-contributing structure formerly listed on the National Register of Historic Places from 1981 to 1989.

It was added to the National Register of Historic Places in 2014.

References

Works Progress Administration in Indiana
Historic districts on the National Register of Historic Places in Indiana
1902 establishments in Indiana
Buildings and structures in Fayette County, Indiana
National Register of Historic Places in Fayette County, Indiana
Parks in Indiana
Protected areas of Fayette County, Indiana
Parks on the National Register of Historic Places in Indiana